On 18 June 2013, a suicide bomber detonated his vest at a funeral in Shergarh , Mardan in northwest Pakistan, killing at least 34 people and injuring over 60 people. The attack took place at a funeral prayer service for Abdullah Khan, who owned a compressed natural gas station. One of the people killed in the attack was Imran Khan Mohmand, who was previously an independent MPA.

Bombing and aftermath 
The bomb blast took place on 18 June 2013 during a funeral procession for a local businessman Haji Abdullah, who was shot a day before by unknown assailants. Imran Khan Mohmand , previously an independent candidate , but then part of the PTI party was injured and then later succumbed to his injuries. The procession was being led by a former MPA of Jamiat Ulema-e-Islam , Maulana Muhammad Qasim , who survived the blast. No militant organization took responsibility for the attack. The Khyber Pakhtunkhwa provincial government announced monetary compensation for those involved. A sum of Rs. 300,000 for the families of those killed and Rs. 100,000 for those injured.

See also
 List of terrorist incidents in 2013
 Terrorist incidents in Pakistan in 2013

References

2013 in Khyber Pakhtunkhwa
2013 murders in Pakistan
21st-century mass murder in Pakistan
Mass murder in 2013
Terrorist incidents in Pakistan in 2013
Crime in Khyber Pakhtunkhwa
Suicide bombings in Khyber Pakhtunkhwa
2013 bombing